Zingar (also Romanized as Zīngar and Zīnger; also known as Zanīgar and Zangār) is a village in Radkan Rural District, in the Central District of Chenaran County, Razavi Khorasan Province, Iran. At the 2006 census, its population was 129, in 36 families.

References 

Populated places in Chenaran County